This is a list of cricketers who played for different teams of Big Bash League.

Adelaide Strikers

Brisbane Heat

Hobart Hurricanes

Melbourne Renegades

Melbourne Stars

Perth Scorchers

Sydney Sixers

Sydney Thunder

See also

List of Women's Big Bash League cricketers

References

External links

Big Bash League cricketers
cricketers